"Lithium" is a song by American rock band Evanescence, recorded for their second studio album, The Open Door. It was released in December 2006 as the album's second single through the band's record label Wind-up Records. An alternative version appears on the band's fourth studio album, Synthesis (2017). "Lithium" was written by the band's lead singer Amy Lee and produced by music producer Dave Fortman. Initially written by Lee on the guitar when she was 16 years old, she later rearranged the song on piano and completed it with the band's performance. The song is a midtempo power ballad which lyrically discusses the uncertainty in choosing between feelings of sorrow and happiness; Lee was inspired by the drug lithium salts and the feeling of numbness that induces. 

Upon its release, the song received generally positive reviews from music critics, many of whom praised Lee's emotional vocal performance and the production. The single entered the top 40 in several countries worldwide, where it spent several weeks charting. A music video directed by Paul Fedor was released in November 2006, and it features Lee and the band performing the song in a dark snowy forest, where Lee eventually drowns in a lake of black water. The song was performed by the band as part of the set list on four of their five worldwide tours, namely The Open Door Tour (2006–07), the Evanescence Tour (2011–12), their fourth worldwide tour which took place in the period 2016–17 and the Synthesis Tour (2017–18).

Background and release
Following the commercial success of their debut studio album Fallen (2003) and its accompanying tour (2003–04), Evanescence returned to the studio to work on material for a new album. During that time, guitarist Ben Moody parted ways with the band and the group sued their previous record manager. In addition to that, the replacement guitarist for Moody, Terry Balsamo suffered from a stroke during the final stages of recording, which further extended the time needed to release and finalize the album. The Open Door was eventually finished and set for release in October 2006. For the songwriting process on the album, Amy Lee mostly collaborated with Balsamo whom she described as a partner who lifted her up and helped her pass the point of refraining when composing. "Lithium" was one of the first songs written for the album, solely by Lee. During an interview with VH1, she revealed that she had written the song on a guitar when she was 16-years old, but never used it in any of her projects despite her liking of its chorus. During the band's work on The Open Door, Lee rearranged the song on a piano and wrote its verses.  Lee describes the song as one "which embraces feeling over numbness". In another interview with MTV Italy, Lee elaborated on the meaning behind the song's lyrics,
It's not literal about the drug for me, I've never taken lithium before. It's sort of a metaphor about numbness and happiness... it's me looking at happiness in a negative way because I've always been... kind of afraid to be happy. Like with the band and the art and everything else, it's always like I'm never letting myself break through into the happiness it seems like, because it's not cool or something. And describing happiness is lithium, it's like saying 'that's numbness, I won't be able to be an artist anymore if I'm happy', which is hilarious because that's just not true, I'm happy. So it's... this fight within the song of... 'do I do this and get out of here and get happy or do I wallow in it like I always do?' and it's cool because at the end of the song I say 'I'm going to let it go', like I am going to be happy.

The drug itself, lithium, is typically used as a mood stabilizer to prevent acute manic behavior in patients with bipolar disorder. Lee chose the title as a "metaphor for happiness from a negative point of view": "It's looking at it like, 'I don't want to numb myself and not feel anymore'." She explained that during her process of writing music, she would get into a mood or a "strange low that I ride" that she would try to overcome by telling herself to let go of certain things, change and rejoice again; such experiences also inspired her to write "Lithium". Initially, Lee was indecisive as to which song to choose as the second single from The Open Door, having in mind four different album tracks. "Lithium" was eventually chosen and made available for digital download on December 4, 2006. It was physically released in the United Kingdom on January 8, 2007. "The Last Song I'm Wasting on You", a track originally written for The Open Door and later included as a bonus track on several editions of the album, was the single's B-side.

Composition
"Lithium" is a power ballad that runs for three minutes and thirty four seconds. According to the sheet music published on the website Musicnotes.com, it is written in the key of B minor with a tempo of 118 beats per minute. The song is composed in the time signature of common time, and follows a basic chord progression of Bm–A–Em. Throughout the track, Lee employs her lower vocal register with her vocals spanning from the low note of A3 to the high note of G5. It starts with a piano intro to which the band joins in for the first verse, accompannying Lee's vocals with drums and guitars. Entertainment Weekly writer Jon Dolan summarized the song as a "tortured Queensrÿche-style pain strummer".

Lyrically, the song speaks about the protagonist's choice between the comfort they find in sorrow and the idea of their possible happiness. As explained by Lee, it was meant to represent the process of "breaking free" from the continuous periods of feeling trapped in bad life situations and relationships, from which nevertheless, it is hard to leave even when one recognizes the negativity that comes along with them. In order to delve into the aforementioned inner conflict, Lee uses the concept of addiction as a medium. The word "lithium" is continuously repeated throughout the song in a metaphorical sense, as the protagonist describes her love–hate relationship with sorrow. A writer of Billboard saw "Lithium" as a lyrical continuation of the theme explored in the band's previous single "Call Me When You're Sober"; while in the former Lee determinedly broke up with her lover, in the latter "[she] mourns his departure as she tries not to wallow in despair that's so familiar, it's almost a friend".  Similarly, a writer for The Daily Princetonian concluded that "Call Me When You're Sober" and "Lithium" from The Open Door were both dedicated to Lee's ex-boyfriend Shaun Morgan, with the latter song exploring his "apparently pathetic" perspective of the story touched upon by Lee in the former one.

Critical reception
Corey Moss, writing for MTV News opined that the song was possibly "even more depressing" than Nirvana's eponymous song from 1992. Rolling Stones Rob Sheffield described "Lithium" as Lee's ode to Kurt Cobain. In his review of The Open Door, Andy Gill from The Independent listed "Lithium" as one of the album's standout tracks; he further noted that it perfectly captures the album's mood "wreathed in the genre staples of black-clad, mascara'd gloom" through lyrics such as "I want to stay in love with my sorrow/ Oh, but God I want to let it go". Stephen Thomas Erlewine highlighted the "churning" song as one of the three best on the album. He felt that it was reminiscent of the tracks prevalent on the band's debut album, characterized by similarity to Tori Amos's material and observed that on The Open Door, this type of songs were "[p]ushed to the background". In an album review, Sara Berry from St. Louis Post-Dispatch opined that "The band deftly balances scorching rock anthems with reflective, piano-heavy ballads like 'Lithium'". IGN's Ed Thompson wrote that Lee's "gentle tickling of the ivories" is notably present on "Lithium".

A Stornoway Gazette  writer dubbed the song an "extreme-power-ballad maelstrom" and felt that it was one of the album's instances where "Pop metal actually does justice to both musical genres". A writer from the Leader-Post praised Lee's "stunning notes" on "Lithium" which he further described as the equivalent of "My Immortal" from the band's debut studio album Fallen (2003). Saying that it "could blow a hole in the wall", a writer from Billboard went on to describe the song as "the kind of number Evanescence was born to perform: cinematic production, gripping orchestration and Amy Lee's voice gliding through verses and soaring over choruses". The writer finished off his review by noting that Lee's "latest musical affair with darkness is captivating" and it would almost make listeners "wish [their] heart was broken". A more mixed review came from R.J. Carter of the music website The Trades, who felt that "Lithium" was one of The Open Doors two songs which would have been better off as bonus tracks, adding "['Lithium'] stretches Lee's glass-shattering capabilities to a level which, at one point, I'm sure deafened the German Shepherd down the street".

In a song review for BBC Online, Fraser McAlpine rated "Lithium" with two out of five stars, noting that it served as a proof that the band has lost their capability to produce successful singles; as a conclusion he noted how the song "sounds lazy and 'can't be arsed' even with their trademark shreiking ghostie vocals and melodrama". In a review of The Open Door, Alex Nunn of the website musicOMH panned the song, calling it an unsuccessful try to "re-do" the band's previous hit "My Immortal" (2003), feeling that it "fall[s] woefully short" at that. He went on concluding that it "serve[s] up added doses of trite, melodramatic rubbish". 

In 2011, Loudwire journalist Mary Ouellette, placed the song at number nine on her list of 10 Best Evanescence Songs. She praised Lee's "sweeping" vocals which "complement" her piano playing and added that "Lithium" was one of the highlights on The Open Door. In 2016, Brittany Porter from AXS listed it at number six on her list of the band's ten best songs.

Commercial performance
"Lithium" achieved moderate chart success in the U.S. The single failed to chart on the main U.S. Billboard Hot 100 chart, but for the week ending of February 10, 2007, it managed to peak at number 24 on the Bubbling Under Hot 100 Singles, a chart which acts as a 25-song extension to the original. "Lithium" managed to chart on two other Billboard component charts in the U.S.; it peaked at number 39 on the Hot Mainstream Rock Tracks where it spent a total of four weeks and at number 37 on the Hot Modern Rock Tracks where it spent a total of three weeks. In Australia, the song debuted at its peak position of number 28 on the ARIA Singles Chart for the chart issue dated January 28, 2007. It spent an additional week at the same position and a total of eight weeks on the chart, last seen at 49 on March 18, 2007. It achieved a higher position of 16 on the New Zealand Singles Chart on January 29, 2007 in its second week of charting there.

Elsewhere, the single managed to chart in various countries across Europe, peaking within the top 50. In the UK, "Lithium" debuted at number 32 on the UK Singles Chart for the week ending January 14, 2007. The following week, it moved to a position of number 52, before falling out afterwards, having spent a total of two weeks on that chart. It fared better on the country's UK Rock Singles Chart where it debuted at number three for the week ending January 7, 2007. It moved to the top of the chart the following week where it spent an additional week afterwards on the chart issue dated January 27, 2007. In Ireland, the song debuted and peaked at number 30 on the Irish Singles Chart for the week ending January 11, 2007. In continental Europe, "Lithium" achieved its highest peak in Italy where it debuted at number two for the week of February 8, 2007. It spent a total of ten weeks on the chart and marks the band's second highest-charting single on the single charts in Italy after "Bring Me to Life" peaked at number one in 2003. The single further peaked at number 23 in Sweden, 40 in Switzerland, 41 in Austria and 44 in Germany.

Music video
A music video directed by Paul Fedor was filmed between October 31 and November 1, 2006. During an interview with MTV News, Lee said, "There's the me in all white and it's really wintry, and then there's the all-in-black Amy under the surface of the water of this lake in the forest. So it's the happiness and the sorrow and we're almost singing to each other, trying to figure out how both of us can work." She added that the video was not "so-in-your-face" in order to be made more literal, but expressed her opinion that it's "all about touching somebody and I hope it does that". For the video, fake snow and trees were used along with various other objects which according to the video's scenic coordinator, were supposed to create a "frozen, gothic, cemetery feel". For the scenes filmed in water, a hydraulic lift was used with which Lee could easily sink and the lake water was colored black.

As of April 2022, the song has 165 million views on YouTube.

According to Moss from MTV News, the video represents a "literal take on somewhat abstract lyrics". It opens with shots of Lee playing the song on a piano at a snowy forest. At the start of the first verse, the band joins in, performing the song separately. Lee is seen lip-syncing the lyrics to the camera throughout; she dons a white dress, with light pale makeup on her face and a bright red lipstick. Later on, she is also shown laying down, as snow falls around her and the camera focuses on her face and expressions. As the song progresses to its final chorus, the singer is seen slowly walking towards a lake, as black petals start falling around her. During the song's last verse, she eventually submerges herself completely. Scenes of Lee in a black dress and singing the song while floating underwater are also interspersed throughout the entire clip. The music video was available online on November 27. Wind-up also released the video on the band's official website on the same day. The clip managed to peak at number four on TRL countdown list of the best music videos in January 2007. A behind-the-scenes clip from the filming set of the music video was posted on January 12, 2007 on the band's official YouTube channel.

Live performances and cover versions
In 2006 and 2007, Evanescence performed the song as part of their set list of their second worldwide tour in support of The Open Door. The song was part of the concerts' "slower, more relaxed theme", where Lee would play the piano accompanied by the band. The band also performed the song during a secret gig concert that took place on November 4, 2009 at the Manhattan Center. Four days later, the band performed the song at the 2009 Maquinaria Festival in São Paulo, Brazil. They added the song to the set list of their third worldwide tour in support of their third self-titled studio album (2011), titled the Evanescence Tour (2011–12). In 2011, they performed an acoustic version of the song at SirusXM which was broadcast on December 25 as part of the Artist Confidential special. The band later also included the song on the set list of their fourth tour which visited cities in the U.S. and Europe in 2016 and 2017. Simon Reed from the website Rock Shot described the performance of "Lithium" as a "sweet, stripped back version" while Shoka Shohani from The Upcoming found elements of "angelic melancholia" in it. Greg M. Schwartz from PopMatters wrote that the performance of the song featured "[Lee] showing off her instrumental skills behind one of her most heartfelt vocals". "Lithium" was sampled by French rapper Sinik on his song "Mauvaise Graine" found on his fourth studio album Ballon d'or (2009). In 2017, a rearranged orchestral version of the song was recorded and included on Evanescence's fourth studio album Synthesis. It was performed during the band's Synthesis Tour in promotion of the album.

Track listing

Single (Part 1)
"Lithium" - 3:44
"The Last Song I'm Wasting on You" - 4:07

Maxi single (Part 2)
"Lithium" - 3:44
"The Last Song I'm Wasting on You" - 4:07
"All That I'm Living For" (Acoustic version) - 4:33
"Lithium" (Video/Acoustic version) - 3:50

7" Vinyl Picture Disc
"Lithium" - 3:44
"The Last Song I'm Wasting on You" - 4:07

EP single
"Lithium" - 3:46
"The Last Song I'm Wasting on You" - 4:07
"All That I'm Living For" (Acoustic version) - 4:31

Charts

See also
List of UK Rock & Metal Singles Chart number ones of 2007

References

2000s ballads
2006 songs
2006 singles
Evanescence songs
Heavy metal ballads
Songs about drugs
Songs written by Amy Lee
Gothic metal songs